The Juno Awards of 2006 were held in Halifax, Nova Scotia, Canada on the weekend of 31 March to 2 April 2006. These ceremonies honour music industry achievements in Canada during the previous year.

The primary ceremonies were hosted by Pamela Anderson at the Halifax Metro Centre on 2 April and televised on CTV. Buck 65 was the ceremony's introduction and preview announcer. Music artists Bedouin Soundclash, Broken Social Scene, Divine Brown, Hedley, Massari and Nickelback performed songs at these ceremonies. Also performing were the co-winners for the 2006 International Album of the Year, The Black Eyed Peas and Coldplay.

Bryan Adams was the 2006 inductee into the Canadian Music Hall of Fame. Chris Martin of Coldplay introduced Adams at the primary ceremony.

Michael Bublé won four awards, more than any other individual that year. Besides winning Artist of the Year, his album It's Time won in both the Album of the Year and Pop Album of the Year categories. His song "Home" from that album was declared Single of the Year.

Awards for most categories were presented on 1 April in a non-televised ceremony at the Halifax World Trade and Convention Centre hosted by Jully Black, with performances by Kardinal Offishall, The Road Hammers and Martha Wainwright. This Saturday gala included the presentation of the Junos' first Humanitarian award to Bruce Cockburn. The Walt Grealis Special Achievement Award was given to True North Records founder Bernie Finkelstein.

International telecast 
The 2006 awards were the first to be televised by broadcasters outside Canada, as seen on the following MTV-related operations:

 Australia (VH1)
 China (MTV)
 India (VH1)
 Italy (MTV)
 Latin America (VH1)
 Malaysia (MTV Asia)
 Portugal (MTV)
 Singapore (MTV Asia)
 Taiwan (MTV Asia)
 United Kingdom (VH1)
 United States (MTV2)

Controversy 
During the televised ceremony, a commercial aired congratulating Michael Bublé for his Single of the Year victory, half an hour before the award was announced.

Both CTV and Warner Music Canada have indicated that they did not, in fact, have advance knowledge that Bublé was the actual winner. As is normal practice, Warner had prepared a number of contingency ads congratulating its artists, to be aired only in the event that the artist in question was actually named a winner. CTV has confirmed that its control room technicians mistakenly aired the Bublé ad in place of another congratulatory announcement.

Host of the show, Pamela Anderson made numerous failed attempts to joke during the show and spoke out against the seal hunt, which elicited loud boos from the audience.  Quotes included, "One of my favourite artists couldn't be here tonight; Seal. He was afraid he might get clubbed to death."

Nominees and winners

Artist of the Year 

Winner: Michael Bublé

Other nominees:
 Boom Desjardins
 Rex Goudie
 Diana Krall
 Kalan Porter

Group of the Year 

Winner: Nickelback

Other nominees:
 Barenaked Ladies
 Blue Rodeo
 Our Lady Peace
 Theory of a Deadman

New Artist of the Year 

Winner: Daniel Powter

Other nominees:
 Divine Brown
 Jonas
 Skye Sweetnam
 Martha Wainwright

New Group of the Year 

Winner: Bedouin Soundclash

Other nominees:
 Boys Night Out
 Hedley
 Pocket Dwellers
 Silverstein

Jack Richardson Producer of the Year 

Winner: Neil Young: "The Painter" by Neil Young

Other nominees:
 Jann Arden and Russell Broom: "Where No One Knows Me" and "Willing To Fall Down" by Jann Arden
 David Foster: "Feeling Good" and "Home" by Michael Bublé
 Nickelback (co-producer Joey Moi): "Animals" and "Photograph" by Nickelback
 Garth Richardson: "Gunnin" and "Villain" by Hedley

Recording Engineer of the Year 

Winner: Vic Florencia: "Everyday is a Holiday" and "Melancholy Melody" by Esthero

Other nominees:
 Russell Broom: "God Bless The American Housewife" by SHeDaisy, "Where No One Knows Me" by Jann Arden
 Adam Messinger and Dylan Bell: "Dry Cleaner from Des Moines" and "Sittin’ In the Cellar" by Cadence
 Randy Staub: "Angels Losing Sleep" by Our Lady Peace, "Animals" by Nickelback
 Denis Tougas: "Oleander" by Sarah Harmer, "Independent Thief" by Kathleen Edwards

Songwriter of the Year 

Winner: Arcade Fire: "Neighborhood #3 (Power Out)" (with Josh Deu), "Rebellion (Lies)", "Wake Up"

Other nominees:
 Kathleen Edwards: "Back to Me" (with Colin Cripps), "Copied Keys", "In State"
 Joel Plaskett: "Happen Now", "Lying on a Beach", "Natural Disaster"
 Ronald Eldon Sexsmith: "Lemonade Stand", "Listen", "One Less Shadow"
 Neil Young: "The Painter", "Prairie Wind", "When God Made Me"

Fan Choice Award 

Winner: Simple Plan

Other nominees:
 Celine Dion
 Diana Krall
 Michael Bublé
 Nickelback

Nominated albums

Album of the Year 
Winner: It’s Time, Michael Bublé

Other nominees:
 All The Right Reasons, Nickelback
 Christmas Songs, Diana Krall
 219 Days, Kalan Porter
 Under The Lights, Rex Goudie

Aboriginal Recording of the Year 
Winner: Hometown, Burnt Project 1

Other nominees:
 Life Is..., Eagle & Hawk
 Muskrat Blues and Rock & Roll, Billy Joe Green
 Rattle & Drum, Asani
 Sinaa, Tanya Tagaq

Adult Alternative Album of the Year 
Winner: Prairie Wind, Neil Young

Other nominees:
 Are You Ready, Blue Rodeo
 Back to Me, Kathleen Edwards
 Broken (and other rogue states), Luke Doucet
 Ex-Girlfriends, Low Millions

Alternative Album of the Year 
Winner: Broken Social Scene, Broken Social Scene

Other nominees:
 Elevator, Hot Hot Heat
 Live It Out, Metric
 So Jealous, Tegan and Sara
 Twin Cinema, The New Pornographers

Blues Album of the Year 
Winner: Let It Loose, Kenny "Blues Boss" Wayne

Other nominees:
 The Gas and the Clutch, The Perpetrators
 Songs of Vice and Sorrow, Julian Fauth
 Villanelle, Paul Reddick
 Voice + Story, Harrison Kennedy

CD/DVD Artwork Design of the Year 
Winner: Hipeponymous by The Tragically Hip: Garnet Armstrong, Rob Baker, Susan Michalek, Will Ruocco

Other nominees:
 Broken Social Scene by Broken Social Scene: Kevin Drew, Christopher Mills, Justin Peroff, Louise Upperton
 In A Coma: 1995–2005 by Matthew Good: Garnet Armstrong, Matthew Good, Ivan Otis
 A Story-Gram From Vinyl Café Inc. by Stuart McLean: Seth
 2005 Album by Wintersleep: Jud Haynes, James Mejia

Children's Album of the Year 
Winner: Baroque Adventure: The Quest for Arundo Donax, Tafelmusik Baroque Orchestra

Other nominees:
 A Butterfly in Time, CMSM Concert Theatre Productions
 Canada Needs You (Volume One), Mike Ford
 The Fabulous Song, Michelle Campagne and Davy Gallant
 Happy All of the Time, Jake

Contemporary Christian/Gospel Album of the Year 
Winner: Amanda Falk, Amanda Falk

Other nominees:
 The Art of Breaking, Thousand Foot Krutch
 In This Time, Patricia Shirley
 Livin’ for Something, Janelle
 MMHMM, Relient K

Classical Album of the Year (large ensemble) 
Winner: Beethoven: Symphonies nos. 5 et 6, Tafelmusik Baroque Orchestra, Bruno Weil

Other nominees:
 J.S. Bach: Keyboard Concertos Vol. 1, Angela Hewitt, Australian Chamber Orchestra, Richard Tognetti
 Concerti Virtuosi, Tafelmusik Baroque Orchestra, Jeanne Lamon
 Freitas Branco: Violin Concerto, Alexandre Da Costa, Extremadura Symphony Orchestra, Jesús Amigo
 Telemann: Tutti flauti!, Arion Ensemble, Jaap ter Linden

Classical Album of the Year (solo or chamber ensemble) 
Winner: Albéniz: Iberia, Marc-André Hamelin

Other nominees:
 Awakening, St. Lawrence String Quartet
 Folklore, Denise Djokic and David Jalbert
 J.S. Bach: Sonates pour violon et clavecin, Vol. 1, James Ehnes and Luc Beauséjour
 Magic Horn, Canadian Brass

Classical Album of the Year (vocal or choral performance) 
Winner: Viardot-Garcia: Lieder Chansons Canzoni Mazurkas, Isabel Bayrakdarian, Serouj Kradjian

Other nominees:
 Hyver, Karina Gauvin, Les Boréades, Francis Colpron
 Scarlatti: Stabat Mater, Emma Kirkby, Daniel Taylor, Theatre of Early Music
 Schubert: Die schöne Müllerin, Michael Schade, Malcolm Martineau
 Schubert: Winterreise, Russell Braun, Carolyn Maule

Francophone Album of the Year 
Winner: Pages blanches, Jim Corcoran

Other nominees:
 Garde la tête haute, Senaya
 Hors de tout doute, France D'Amour
 Sur le fil, Stéphanie Lapointe
 Le trashy saloon, Anik Jean

International Album of the Year 
Winners (tie): Monkey Business, The Black Eyed Peas and X&Y, Coldplay

Other nominees:
 Breakaway, Kelly Clarkson
 Love. Angel. Music. Baby., Gwen Stefani
 The Massacre, 50 Cent

Instrumental Album of the Year 
Winner: Belladonna, Daniel Lanois

Other nominees:
 Balance, Tomas Hamilton aka Charles T. Cozens
 Christmas Serenity, George Carlaw aka Yuri Sazonoff
 Rainy Days and Mondays, Nancy Walker
 Sentimental Strings, Bobby Creed & His Orchestra aka Roberto Occhipinti

Contemporary Jazz Album of the Year 
Winner: Radio Guantánamo (Guantánamo Blues Project Vol. 1), Jane Bunnett

Other nominees:
 Encuentro en la Habana, Hilario Durán and Perspectiva
 One Take: Volume Two, Marc Rogers, Robi Botos, Phil Dwyer, Terri Lyne Carrington
 Shurum Burum Jazz Circus, David Buchbinder
 Yemaya, Roberto Occhipinti

Traditional Jazz Album of the Year 
Winner: Ask Me Later, Don Thompson Quartet

Other nominees:
 In a Sentimental Mood, Ian McDougall Quintet
 Let Me Tell You About My Day, Phil Dwyer with Alan Jones and Rodney Whitaker
 Mainly Mingus, Dave Young Quintet
 Time Flies, P.J. Perry

Vocal Jazz Album of the Year 
Winner: Christmas Songs, Diana Krall

Other nominees:
 Just You, Just Me, Ranee Lee
 Rock Swings, Paul Anka
 Sophie Milman, Sophie Milman
 Twenty For One, Cadence

Pop Album of the Year 
Winner: It’s Time, Michael Bublé

Other nominees:
 Boom Desjardins, Boom Desjardins
 Jann Arden, Jann Arden
 These Old Charms, Theresa Sokyrka
 219 Days, Kalan Porter

Rock Album of the Year 
Winner: All the Right Reasons, Nickelback

Other nominees:
 Gasoline, Theory of a Deadman
 Healthy in Paranoid Times, Our Lady Peace
 Hedley, Hedley
 Jonas, Jonas

Roots and Traditional Album of the Year (Solo) 
Winner: Hair in My Eyes Like a Highland Steer, Corb Lund

Other nominees:
 Love Sweet Love, Lynn Miles
 Mantras For Madmen, Harry Manx
 Récidive, Yves Lambert
 Songs From The Gravel Road, Ian Tyson

Roots and Traditional Album of the Year (Group) 
Winner: The Duhks, The Duhks

Other nominees:
 Ambassador, Elliott Brood
 Destination Unknown, Sexsmith and Kerr
 The Hard and the Easy, Great Big Sea
 Malins plaisirs, Genticorum

World Music Album of the Year 
Winner: Humo de tabaco, Alex Cuba Band

Other nominees:
 Capivara, Celso Machado
 Djama, Alpha Yaya Diallo
 Fusion, Adham Shaikh
 Gaïa, Gaïa

Nominated releases

Single of the Year 
Winner: "Home", Michael Bublé

Other nominees:
 "When the Night Feels My Song", Bedouin Soundclash
 "Inside and Out", Feist
 "Man I Used To Be", k-os
 "Photograph", Nickelback

Classical Composition of the Year 
Winner: "String Quartet No. 1 (The Awakening)", Christos Hatzis

Other nominees:
 "Illuminations", Brian Cherney
 "Our Finest Hour", Chan Ka Nin
 "Illuminations", Peter Togni
 "Symphony for Strings", Robert Turner

Country Recording of the Year 
Winner: The Road Hammers, The Road Hammers

Other nominees:
 Amanda Wilkinson, Amanda Wilkinson
 Hey, Do You Know Me, Lisa Brokop
 Life Goes On, Terri Clark
 Waitin' on the Wonderful, Aaron Lines

Dance Recording of the Year 
Winner: "Spanish Fly", Hatiras & Macca featuring Shawna B.

Other nominees:
 "Hot Box Da", Skunk
 "Robopop", M1
 "She’s Looking Good", Boza
 "Walkin & Talkin", Ray Charles vs Dio

Music DVD of the Year 
Winner: Hipeponymous, The Tragically Hip

Other nominees:
 À la station C, Ariane Moffatt
 Live at the Montréal Jazz Festival, Diana Krall
 LIVE 8 - Toronto, Various Artists
 ¿Publicity Stunt?, K-os

R&B/Soul Recording of the Year 
Winner: Back for More, Shawn Desman

Other nominees:
 Divine Brown, Divine Brown
 Massari, Massari
 "The Naughty Song", Cory Lee
 This Is Me, Jully Black

Rap Recording of the Year 
Winner: The Dusty Foot Philosopher, K'Naan

Other nominees:
 Boy-Cott-In the Industry, Classified
 Fire and Glory, Kardinal Offishall
 It's Called Life, Eternia
 United We Fall, Sweatshop Union

Reggae Recording of the Year 
Winner: Reggae Time, Blessed

Other nominees:
 Hot Gal featuring Rally Bop, Carl Henry
 Live Up, Truths and Rights
 Mind & Body Sold, Odel
 River of Healing, Jah Beng

Video of the Year 
Winner: "Devil’s Eyes" by Buck 65 - producer: Micah Meisner, Rich Terfry

Other nominees:
 "Bom Bom Bom" by Living Things - producer: Floria Sigismondi
 "Con Toda Palabra" by Lhasa de Sela - producer: Ralph Dfouni, Brigitte Henry
 "Neighborhood #3 (Power Out)" by Arcade Fire - producer: Plates Animation
 "Rebellion (Lies)" by Arcade Fire - producer: Chris Grismer

References

External links 
 Radio@UPEI Juno Coverage - radio.upei.ca/junos
 Junos via CNW: "Thirty-two Awards Handed Out at 2006 JUNO Gala Dinner & Awards Ceremony in Halifax, Nova Scotia" 1 April 2006
 CTV media release: Junos (3 April 2006)
 Juno Awards site

2006
2006 music awards
2006 in Canadian music
April 2006 events in Canada
2006 in Nova Scotia
Events in Halifax, Nova Scotia